The Karmaveer Chakra Award is the global civilian honours given by the international confederation of NGO (iCONGO) in partnership with United Nations to the people across the globe for relentless courage. The award is tribute to A. P. J. Abdul Kalam, 11th President of India, who had offered to be the ambassador for the awards and international volunteering olympiad.

Awards
The award is presented annually in mid of November to individuals and organisations in broad categories like activism, education, volunteering and healthcare. Notable recipients include Deepika Narayan Bhardwaj, Devika Vaid, Harish Iyer, Jason Fernandes, Shruti Kapoor, Rohith Vakrala, Manju Latha Kalanidhi, Anurag Chauhan, Jyoti Dhawale, Kajol,  Sudha Menon

Verghese Kurien, known as father of the white revolution of India, is the first recipient of Karmaveer lifetime achievement award.

Hierarchy of awards

Karmaveer Chakra GOLD - Nominations may be proposed and chosen by council of fellows strictly. Self-nominations or nominations by fellows and citizens are not accepted.
Karmaveer Chakra SILVER - Nominations may be proposed by fellows only and will be chosen at the discretion of the council of fellows. Self-nominations or nominations by citizens are not accepted.
Karmaveer Chakra BRONZE - Nominations may be proposed by all fellows and citizens of the world. Self-nominations are also welcome. Nominations will be accepted at the discretion of the council of fellows.
Karmaveer Puraskar.
Karmaveer Jyoti.

References

Indian awards
International awards